The Pacific Coast Sectional Figure Skating Championships is an annual figure skating competition sanctioned by U.S. Figure Skating. It is one of three sectional competitions alongside the Midwestern Sectional Figure Skating Championships and Eastern Sectional Figure Skating Championships.

Skaters compete in five levels: Senior, Junior, Novice, Intermediate, and Juvenile.  Medals are awarded in four disciplines: Ladies singles, Men's singles, Pairs, and Ice dance.  Medals are given out in four colors: gold (first), silver (second), bronze (third), and pewter (fourth).  Skaters who place in the top four at the Pacific Coast Sectional advance to the U.S. Figure Skating Championships.

The 2018 Pacific Coast Sectionals were held in Spokane, Washington.

Senior medalists

Men

Women

Pairs

Ice dancing

Junior medalists

Men

Women

Pairs

Ice Dance

References

External links
 1999 Pacific Coast Sectionals
2002 Pacific Coast Sectionals
2003 Pacific Coast Sectionals
2004 Pacific Coast Sectionals
2005 Pacific Coast Sectionals
2006 Pacific Coast Sectionals
2007 Pacific Coast Sectionals
2008 Pacific Coast Sectionals
2009 Pacific Coast Sectionals
2010 Pacific Coast Sectionals
2011 Pacific Coast Sectionals
2012 Pacific Coast Sectionals
2015 Pacific Coast Sectionals

Figure skating competitions
Figure skating in the United States
Sports in the Western United States